Erin French is an American chef. She is the owner of The Lost Kitchen, a renowned 40-seat restaurant in Freedom, Maine.

She was a semifinalist for James Beard Award for Best Chefs in America in 2016, 2018, 2019, and 2020.

The Lost Kitchen is a TV Series on Magnolia Network.

Books

References

External links 
 (6 mins)
Profile on CBS Sunday Morning October 9, 2022

American chefs
Year of birth missing (living people)
Living people